Taqiabad, sometimes also written Takiabad or Taghiabad, may refer to:

Fars Province
Taqiabad, Fars, a village in Jahrom County

Gilan Province
Takiabad, Gilan, a village in Talesh County

Hamadan Province
Taqiabad, Hamadan, a village in Tuyserkan County

Isfahan Province
Taqiabad, Chadegan, a village in Chadegan County
Taqiabad, Karvan, a village in Tiran and Karvan County

Kerman Province
Taqiabad, Bardsir, a village in Bardsir County
Taqiabad, Rafsanjan, a village in Rafsanjan County
Taqiabad, Ravar, a village in Ravar County
Taqiabad, Rigan, a village in Rigan County
Taqiabad, Zarand, a village in Zarand County

Khuzestan Province
Taqiabad, Khuzestan, a village in Masjed Soleyman County

Kurdistan Province
Taqiabad, Kurdistan, a village in Qorveh County

Lorestan Province
Taqiabad, Dorud, a village in Dorud County
Taqiabad, Khorramabad, a village in Khorramabad County
Taqiabad-e Kan Kot, a village in Delfan County

Mazandaran Province
Taqiabad, Mazandaran, a village in Tonekabon County

North Khorasan Province
Taqiabad, North Khorasan

Razavi Khorasan Province
Taqiabad, Fariman, a village in Fariman County
Taqiabad, Firuzeh, a village in Firuzeh County
Taqiabad, Kalat, a village in Kalat County
Taqiabad, Mashhad, a village in Mashhad County
Taqiabad, Nishapur, a village in Nishapur County
Taqiabad, Quchan Atiq, a village in Quchan County
Taqiabad, Torbat-e Jam, a village in Torbat-e Jam County

Semnan Province
Taqiabad, Aradan, a village in Aradan County

Sistan and Baluchestan Province
Taqiabad, Sistan and Baluchestan, a village in Khash County

South Khorasan Province
Taqiabad, Khusf, a village in Khusf County
Taqiabad, Qaleh Zari, a village in Khusf County

Tehran Province
Taqiabad-e Shahrestan

Yazd Province
Taqiabad, Abarkuh, a village in Abarkuh County
Taqiabad, Behabad, a village in Behabad County
Taqiabad, Aliabad, a village in Taft County
Taqiabad, Dehshir, a village in Taft County